The 2020 Inter Miami CF season was the first season of existence for Inter Miami CF. They participated in Major League Soccer, the top tier of soccer in the United States. It was the first time since 2001 that a first division soccer club will have competed in the Greater Miami Area.

Inter Miami played their first competitive match on March 1 away to Los Angeles FC. Their first home match was planned for March 14 against the LA Galaxy, former team of Inter Miami president David Beckham, but it was postponed due to the COVID-19 pandemic.

Management

|-
!colspan="2" style="background:#F7B5CD; color:#000000; text-align:left" |Ownership
|-

|-
!colspan="2" style="background:#F7B5CD; color:#000000; text-align:left" |Front office
|-

|-
!colspan="2" style="background:#F7B5CD; color:#000000; text-align:left" |Coaching staff
|-

Roster

Transfers

Transfers in

Transfers out

MLS SuperDraft

Non-competitive

Preseason

Competitive

Major League Soccer

League tables

Eastern Conference

Overall

MLS is Back – group stage

Matches

MLS Cup Playoffs

Overall statistics

Top scorers

As of 9 September 2020.

See also 
 2020 Fort Lauderdale CF season

References 

2019
2020 Major League Soccer season
American soccer clubs 2020 season
2020 in sports in Florida